Stella Brennan (born 1974) is a New Zealand artist, curator, and essayist.

Background 
Brennan was born in 1974, in Auckland, New Zealand. She graduated from the  University of Auckland with an MFA in 1999. She currently lives in Auckland.

Career 
Brennan is a mixed media installation artist. She utilises a variety of materials including found objects, video projection, and sculpture. Her work explores concepts of space and time between individuals and address issues such as industrialisation, colonialism, and technology.

Brennan has published as an art critic and appeared in ArtAsiaPacific, the New Zealand Listener and Art New Zealand. She has also worked as an essayist for artists Patricia Piccinini and Ann Veronica Janssens.

In 2001 Brennan was the artist in residence at Artspace Sydney and in 2004 she was the inaugural Digital Artist in Residence at the Department of Screen and Media Studies at University of Waikato. In 2007 she received a fellowship at Apex Arts in New York.

Brennan is a co-founder of Aotearoa Digital Arts and was co-editor, with Su Ballard, for the Aotearoa Digital Arts Reader.

In 2006 she was a finalist for the Walters Prize, with her installation Wet Social Sculpture, first shown at St Paul St Gallery, Auckland.

Work by Brennan is held in the collection of the Chartwell Collection in the Auckland Art Gallery Toi o Tāmaki.

Brennan is represented by Trish Clark Gallery.

Exhibitions 
Brennan has exhibited widely in New Zealand and internationally in Australia, Asia, North America, Europe.
 2002 Another Green World, Artspace, Sydney
 2004 Tommorw Never Knows, The Physics Room, Christchurch
 2005 Memory Hole, Trish Clark Gallery, Auckland
 2006 Envoy from Mirror City and No Stairway, Starkwhite, Auckland
 2007 No More Gaps, Starkwhite, Auckland
 2008 South Pacific, Two Rooms, Auckland
 2008 Second Child, Starkwhite, Auckland
 2009 The Middle Landscape, Starkwhite, Auckland
 2012 every room i have ever been in, Audio Foundation, Auckland
 2015 Truth + Fiction, Trish Clark Gallery, Auckland (group show with Roger Ballen, Chris Corson-Scott, Jennifer French, Michael Ghent, Alan Miller, Marie Shannon, Ann Shelton, Vincent Ward, and Christine Webster)
 2016 Black Flags, Trish Clark Gallery, Auckland

Curated exhibitions 

 1999 Nostalgia for the Future, Artspace NZ, Auckland
 2002–2003 Dirty Pixels, Artspace NZ, Adam Art Gallery, Dunedin Public Art Gallery and Waikato Museum of Art and History
 2008 Cloudland: Digital Art from Aotearoa New Zealand, The Substation, Singapore, co-currator

References

Further reading 
Artist files for Stella Brennan are held at:
 Angela Morton Collection, Takapuna Library 
 Te Aka Matua Research Library, Museum of New Zealand Te Papa Tongarewa 
 Fine Arts Library | Te Herenga Toi The University of Auckland Libraries and Learning Services 
 E. H. McCormick Research Library, Auckland Art Gallery Toi o Tāmaki 
 Hocken Collections Uare Taoka o Hākena

External links 
 Official website

Living people
1974 births
Artists from Auckland
University of Auckland alumni
New Zealand women artists
New Zealand women curators